Darkness, the direct opposite of lightness, is defined as a lack of illumination, an absence of visible light, or a surface that absorbs light, such as black. 

Human vision is unable to distinguish colors in conditions of very low luminance because the hue sensitive photoreceptor cells on the retina are inactive when light levels are insufficient, in the range of visual perception referred to as scotopic vision.

The emotional response to darkness has generated metaphorical usages of the term in many cultures, often used to describe an unhappy or foreboding feeling.

Referring to a time of day, complete darkness occurs when the Sun is more than 18° below the horizon, without the effects of twilight on the night sky.

Scientific

Perception
The perception of darkness differs from the mere absence of light due to the effects of after images on perception. In perceiving, the eye is active, and the part of the retina that is unstimulated produces a complementary afterimage.

Physics

In terms of physics, an object is said to be dark when it absorbs photons, causing it to appear dim compared to other objects.  For example, matte black paint does not reflect much visible light and appears dark, whereas white paint reflects much light and appears bright. For more information, see color. An object may appear dark, but it may be bright at a frequency that humans cannot perceive.

A dark area has limited light sources, making things hard to see. Exposure to alternating light and darkness (night and day) has caused several evolutionary adaptations to darkness.  When a vertebrate, like a human, enters a dark area, its pupils dilate, allowing more light to enter the eye and improving night vision. Also, the light detecting cells in the human eye (rods and cones) will regenerate more unbleached rhodopsin when adapting to darkness.

One scientific measure of darkness is the Bortle scale, which indicates the night sky's and stars' brightness at a particular location, and the observability of celestial objects at that location.

The material known as Vantablack is one of the darkest substances known, absorbing up to 99.965% of visible light (at 663 nm if the light is perpendicular to the material), and was developed by Surrey NanoSystems in the United Kingdom. The name is a compound of the acronym VANTA (vertically aligned nanotube arrays) and the color black.

Technical
The color of a point, on a standard 24-bit computer display, is defined by three RGB (red, green, blue) values, each ranging from 0–255. When the red, green, and blue components of a pixel are fully illuminated (255,255,255), the pixel appears white; when all three components are unilluminated (0,0,0), the pixel appears black.

Cultural

Artistic

Artists use darkness to emphasize and contrast the presence of light. Darkness can be used as a counterpoint to areas of lightness to create leading lines and voids. Such shapes draw the eye around areas of the painting. Shadows add depth and perspective to a painting. See chiaroscuro for a discussion of the uses of such contrasts in visual media.

Color paints are mixed together to create darkness, because each color absorbs certain frequencies of light. Theoretically, mixing together the three primary colors, or the three secondary colors, will absorb all visible light and create black. In practice, it is difficult to prevent the mixture from taking on a brown tint.

Literature

As a poetic term in the Western world, darkness is used to connote the presence of shadows, evil, and foreboding, or in modern parlance, to connote that a story is grim, heavy, and/or depressing.

Religion
The first creation narrative in Judaism and Christianity begins with darkness, into which is introduced the creation of light, and the separation of this light from the darkness (as distinct from the creation of the Sun and Moon on the fourth day of creation). Thus, although both light and darkness are included in the comprehensive works of God, darkness was considered "the second to last plague" (Exodus 10:21), and the location of "weeping and gnashing of teeth" (Matthew 8:12).

Erebus was a primordial deity in Greek mythology, representing the personification of darkness.

Philosophy
In Chinese philosophy, yin is the complementary feminine part of the taijitu and is represented by a dark lobe.

Poetry
The use of darkness as a rhetorical device has a long-standing tradition. William Shakespeare, working in the 16th and 17th centuries, made a character called the "prince of darkness" (King Lear: III, iv) and gave darkness jaws with which to devour love. (A Midsummer Night's Dream: I, i) Geoffrey Chaucer, a 14th-century Middle English writer of The Canterbury Tales, wrote that knights must cast away the "workes of darkness". In Divine Comedy, Dante described hell as "solid darkness stain'd".

Language
It is however still used in the Dutch saying "" which means secretly.  meant "shadow" and remained in use. The word dark eventually evolved from the word .

See also
Lightness
Shadow
Theory of colours
Nyctophobia

References

External links

 
Blindness